The Board of Road Commissioners for Alaska, more commonly known as the Alaska Road Commission or ARC, was created in 1905 as a board of the U.S. War Department. It was responsible for the construction and improvement of many important Alaska highways, such as the Richardson Highway, Steese Highway, Elliot Highway and Edgerton Highway, among others.

The commission was transferred to the Department of the Interior in 1932, and was absorbed by the Bureau of Public Roads, a division of the Commerce Department in 1956. Today, responsibility for road development and maintenance in Alaska lies with the Alaska Department of Transportation & Public Facilities.

Background and Motivation 
The Alaska Interior was largely roadless up until about the 1870s, with only a network of trails established by the native people of Alaska, which Russian, and later American, traders and prospectors used as well. The Russians in Alaska stuck to coastal regions, and built almost no new trails or roads during their time of possession (1741 to 1867), and early mining, such as near Sitka was close to the coast.
In the 1870s and 1880s, spurred by increased settlement and prospecting, some settlers began making arrangements with the natives, improving trails and in some cases imposing tolls, such as on the Dalton Trail.

Prospectors and others wished for an easier overland route between a year-round port in southern Alaska and the Yukon River. The US Army began surveying and determined the best route would be north from Valdez. The Army started construction of a pack trail from Valdez to Eagle in 1898.
By 1899 this project was also known as the Trans-Alaska Military Road. In the early 1900s congressional committees investigating transportation needs in Alaska, including a 1903 visit by a Senate committee on Territories, recommended that the War Department construct a trail system and upgrade the newly built Valdez-Eagle trail to a wagon road. Congress approved legislation establishing a commission to oversee these and other improvements on January 27, 1905,
and the Board of Road Commissioners for Alaska, generally referred to as the Alaska Road Commission (ARC), was organized May 15, 1905, by order of the Secretary of War.

Structure and operations 
The ARC had three members, as follows;

The chairman or president of the board, in overall charge of operations, an engineer officer with fieldwork responsibility, and a secretary and disbursing officer who ran the office proper and paid for work executed. The Department of War at the time was in charge of the US Army and many of the board members were US Army officers, including the first chairman, Brigadier General Wilds P. Richardson. Initially, the board reported directly to the War Department through the Army Adjutant General but on December 29, 1917, supervision was transferred to the Chief of Engineers, the head of the United States Army Corps of Engineers.

Funding for commission operations was initially intended to come from 70 percent of the business license fees (Federal vocational and trade license taxes) from areas outside incorporated towns. However this funding source was sporadic and insufficient so it was supplemented with general congressional appropriations, with yearly appropriations initially running between $100,000 and $500,000. There was also a special tax imposed on residents of unincorporated areas of 2 days labor at road building, or 8 USD cash to fund construction. In 1912, after Alaska became a territory this was revised to $4 but was levied against all Alaska residents. This resulted in a mix of about 60–70% congressional appropriation and 30–40% territorial funding.

In 1914 the Territorial Legislature set up road districts with elected road commissioners but this did not last. Shortly thereafter, in 1917, the Territorial Legislature set up a Territorial Board of Road Commissioners and 4 regional boards.
These boards tended to approve projects and give funding to the ARC to carry them out, and the head of the territorial boards were sometimes the superintendents of the relevant ARC district, and the chairman of the Territorial Board was often the chairman of the ARC.

From its formation, the ARC also had subcontracted  responsibility from the Department of Agriculture for road maintenance in the Tongass and Chugach national forests, but in 1922 this was transferred to the Department of the Interior's Bureau of Public Roads, which then took on construction of roads and trails in the forests.

Scope of work 
The ARC got busy quickly, by 1907 the commission had flagged  of winter trails on the Seward Peninsula, built  of road, upgraded 200 miles of existing trails, and cleared  of new trail. A significant project was construction of a spur trail from Gulkana on the Valdez-Eagle route to the new mining camp of Fairbanks. By 1932 the ARC had built and maintained  of roads,  of tram road,  of sled roads,  of trails,  of temporary flagged trails, 26 airfields, and 32 shelter cabins. Total expenditures were in excess of $18 million.

The ARC did not favor use of these trails by trucks or automobiles, declaring in 1914 that it made "no pretense of having built roads adapted for automobile travel", nevertheless by 1922 90% of the summer traffic was with motorized vehicles. In permafrost areas corduroy road construction techniques were used. Small streams were bridged with culverts. Initially larger streams were forded or had ferries provided (such as the ferry across the Tanana at Rika's Landing), but as time and funds permitted, larger bridging projects were carried out, such as the  bridge across the Tazlina River, and the  bridge across the Tonsina River.

Following Years 

In 1932 the Alaska Road Commission was transferred to the Department of the Interior. The Interior Department imposed registration and license fee requirements on all vehicles in Alaska, which  many vehicle operators ignored. In addition, a toll was collected from commercial vehicles on the Richardson Highway. The Interior Department also operated the Alaska Railroad, and in a controversial bid to move traffic to the railroad, the tolls were increased to between $100 and $175. The commercial freighters did not like this toll and evaded it by various means. By 1940, a pirate ferry (complete with skull and crossbones flag) was operating at Big Delta, Alaska, at the Tanana River crossing, with incidents such as seizing the local Deputy Marshal resulting. The government was unable to enforce the law, with at least one grand jury in Fairbanks refusing to return indictments, finding the tax discriminatory. Finally in 1942, Interior Secretary Harold L. Ickes repealed the toll.

The ARC remained with the Department of the Interior until 1956 when it was absorbed by the Bureau of Public Roads, then a division of the Commerce Department. which later evolved into the Federal Highway Administration. The ARC operated as usual, federally managed, until 1960. With the advent of statehood in 1959 the State of Alaska assumed road building and maintenance responsibility, but contracted to the ARC for the work. However, in 1960, the state ended the agreement with the Bureau of Public Roads, and the ARC was transferred to the state, becoming the Alaska State Highway Department.

Legacy 

The ARC left a lasting mark on the development of Alaska. Many of Alaska's most important and historic highways are named for Road Commission officers instrumental in their construction, including

 Richardson Highway, named for Brigadier General Wilds P. Richardson
 Steese Highway, named for Colonel James G. Steese
 Elliott Highway, named for Major Malcolm Elliott
 Edgerton Highway, named for Major General Glen E. Edgerton
 Taylor Highway, named for ARC President (1932–1948) Ike P. Taylor

In addition signs of the work of the ARC can still be seen, for example some of the shelter cabins built by the ARC during the construction of the Denali Park Road are still in use as ranger patrol cabins by National Park Service rangers in Denali National Park and Preserve.

List of ARC Presidents 

 1905-1917 Wilds P. Richardson
 1917-1920 William H. Waugh
 1920-1920 John C. Gotwals
 1920-1927 James G. Steese
 1927-1932 Malcolm Elliott
 1932-1948 Ike P. Taylor
 1948-1951 John R. Noyes
 1951-1956 Angelo F. Ghiglione

References

External links 

 Recorded interviews with Woody Johansen (the Johansen Expressway is named after him)  from Alaska's Digital Archives about the ARC
 Image search also from Alaska's Digital Archives, for images related to the ARC
 Typical plans for shelter cabins built by the ARC at the Library of Congress archive of the Historic American Buildings Survey

Pre-statehood history of Alaska